Nahuel Carabaña Valenzuela (born 10 November 1999) is an Andorran runner specialising in the 3000 metres steeplechase. He won a silver medal at the 2022 Ibero-American Championships with a new national record of 8:35.19.

International competitions

Personal bests
Outdoor
3000 metres – 8:38.20 (Pamplona 2019)
5000 metres – 14:23.25 (Huelva 2021)
10,000 metres – 29:30.91 (Faro 2022)
3000 metres steeplechase – 8:32.03 (Huelva 2022) NR
10 kilometres – 29:57 (Barcelona 2020)
Indoor
1500 metres – 3:48.74 (Sabadell 2022)
3000 metres –	8:07.63 (Ourense 2022) NR

References

1999 births
Living people
Andorran male middle-distance runners
Athletes (track and field) at the 2022 Mediterranean Games
Mediterranean Games competitors for Andorra